Masłowo may refer to the following places:
Masłowo, Piła County in Greater Poland Voivodeship (west-central Poland)
Masłowo, Rawicz County in Greater Poland Voivodeship (west-central Poland)
Masłowo, Śrem County in Greater Poland Voivodeship (west-central Poland)
Masłowo, Kartuzy County in Pomeranian Voivodeship (north Poland)
Masłowo, Słupsk County in Pomeranian Voivodeship (north Poland)